The Tukwila Formation is a geological formation is King county, Washington within the Puget Group. It is named after Tukwila area, which is close to the formation. The formation consists of various fossils of marine origin.

The Tukwila formation is mainly composed of andesitic to dacitic volcanic sandstone, siltstone, shale, tuff-breccia, tuff, lahar, and carbonaceous shales.  The tuff-breccia has an approximate age of 42 Ma.

Fauna

Vertebrate fauna 
Vertebrate fauna mainly consists of just shark remains. Mainly one unnamed species of Goblin shark and one unnamed species belonging to the same genus as the Whitetip reef shark.
 Triaenodon.sp
Mitsukurina.sp

Invertebrate fauna
Are the following:
? Coeloma martinezensis
Zanthopsis vulgaris
Terebratulina washingtoniana
Protula sp.
Glycymeris saggittata
Venericardia clarki
Colwellia bretzi
Brisaster sp.

References

Eocene United States